= Chapada (Manaus) =

Neighbourhood in Amazonas, Brazil

- Neighbourhood
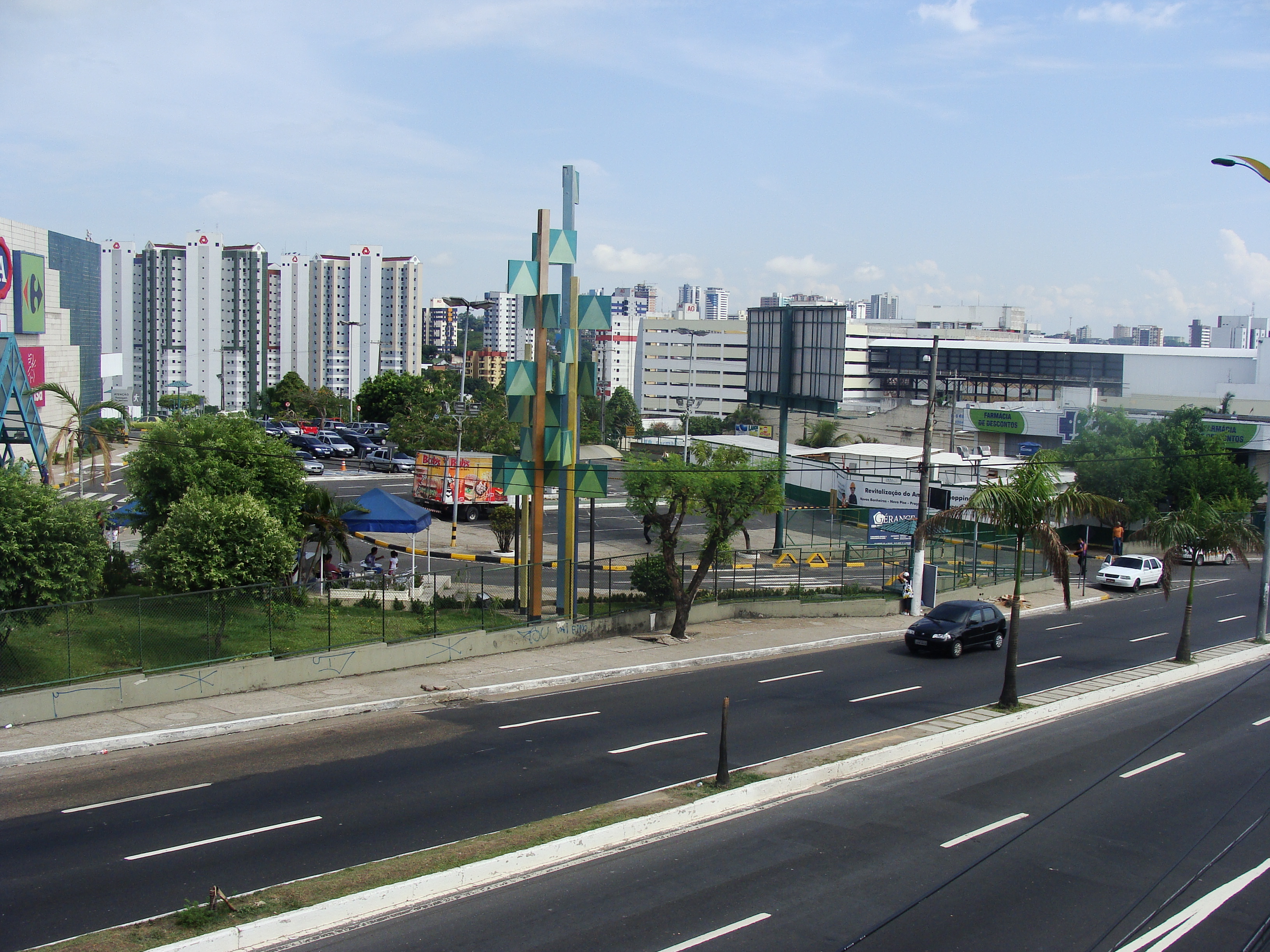
- Interactive map of Chapada
- Coordinates: 3.0942406°S 60.0420449°W
- Country: Brazil
- Region: North
- State: Amazonas
- Municipality: Manaus
- Administrative Zone: South-Central Zone

Chapada is an upper middle class neighborhood in the South-Central Zone of Manaus, Amazonas.
